The U.S. state of Oregon has 27 official emblems, as designated by the Oregon State Legislature. Most of the symbols are listed in Title 19, Chapter 186 of the Oregon Revised Statutes (2011 edition). Oregon's first symbol was the motto Alis Volat Propriis, written and translated in 1854. Latin for "She Flies With Her Own Wings", the motto remained unchanged until 1957, when "The Union" became the official state motto. Alis Volat Propriis became the state motto once again in 1987. Originally designed in 1857, usage of the Oregon State Seal began after Oregon became the 33rd state of the United States on February 14, 1859. The motto and seal served as Oregon's only symbols until over 50 years later, when the Oregon-grape became the state flower in 1899. Oregon had six official symbols by 1950 and 22 symbols by 2000. The newest symbol of Oregon is brewer's yeast, declared the state microbe in 2013.

While some of the symbols are unique to Oregon, others are used by multiple states. For example, the North American beaver is also the state animal of New York, and the Chinook salmon (sometimes known as the king salmon) is also the state fish of Alaska. The square dance and milk are commonly used state dances and state beverages, respectively.

Insignia

Flora and fauna

Geology

Culture

Unofficial symbols and unsuccessful proposals
While most states have an official nickname, the Oregon Legislature never officially adopted one. Oregon's unofficial nickname is "The Beaver State". Unofficial slogans for Oregon include "things look different here" and "Oregon, We Love Dreamers", the latter of which alludes to the "basic sense of idealism" of the state's culture. In the 1950s and 60s, Oregon license plates featured the unofficial motto, "Pacific Wonderland".

Several symbols have been proposed for addition to the list of official state symbols but were never adopted. The "Oregon Waltz" was approved as the state waltz by the Oregon House in 1997, but the proposal did not succeed in the Senate. In 2001, legislation designating the Kiger Mustang, a horse breed unique to southeastern Oregon, as the state horse was introduced, but not adopted. It was suggested in 2003 that Oregon have an official state tartan, but the bill never passed out of committee.

See also

Lists of Oregon-related topics

References

General
 
 

Specific

External links

Oregon
Oregon culture
State symbols